Adrian Leroy John Patrick (born 15 June 1973) is a male English former sprinter who specialised in the 400 metres.

Athletics career
Patrick represented Great Britain at one outdoor and two indoor World Championships. His personal bests in the event are 45.63 seconds outdoors (Lausanne 1995) and 46.77 seconds indoors (Birmingham 1999).

He represented England and won the gold medal in the 4 x 400 metres relay at the 1994 Commonwealth Games held in Victoria, British Columbia, Canada, along with teammates, David McKenzie, Peter Crampton, and Du'aine Ladejo and heat runners Alex Fugallo and Mark Smith.

Competition record

References

External links 
 

1973 births
Living people
English male sprinters
British male sprinters
World Athletics Championships athletes for Great Britain
Athletes (track and field) at the 1994 Commonwealth Games
Commonwealth Games medallists in athletics
Commonwealth Games gold medallists for England
World Athletics Indoor Championships medalists
Medallists at the 1994 Commonwealth Games